The National Emergency Management Agency (NEMA; Māori: Te Rākau Whakamarumaru) is the public service department of New Zealand responsible for providing leadership and support around national, local and regional emergencies. It is an autonomous departmental agency hosted by the Department of Prime Minister and Cabinet. It replaced the Ministry of Civil Defence and Emergency Management in December 2019.

The Minister for Emergency Management is currently Kieran McAnulty.

History
No formal civil defence or emergency management structure existed in New Zealand until the 1930s, when the increasing threat of war prompted the formation of the Emergency Precautions Scheme, which was controlled by the Department of Internal Affairs. In addition to war, earthquake risk was another concern of the Scheme, prompted in part by the 1931 Hawke's Bay earthquake. During World War II, the name of the EPS was changed to Civil Defence. While EPS/Civil Defence did not need to respond to any invasion attempts, it was twice called upon to assist with earthquake recovery efforts in Wellington and the Wairarapa region in 1942.

Following the war, responsibility for civil defence was assumed by the Department of Internal Affairs. A Review of Defence white paper, issued by the Second Labour Government amid the fear of nuclear war, proposed the establishment of a separate Ministry of Civil Defence. The first Director of Civil Defence was J.V. Meech (also the Secretary of Internal Affairs), though in practice much of the work was delegated to Andrew Sharp; the first Minister of Civil Defence in the post-war period was Bill Anderton (also the Minister of Internal Affairs). The Civil Defence Act 1962 set out in legislation the responsibilities and duties of the Ministry. In 1964, the first full-time Director of Civil Defence was appointed: Brigadier R.C. Queree.

A new Ministry for Emergency Management was established under the National/New Zealand First Coalition Government by Civil Defence Minister Jack Elder on 1 July 1999, following the Review of Emergency Services. This replaced the existing Ministry of Civil Defence. Later, the department name changed again to become the Ministry of Civil Defence & Emergency Management.

The Ministry of Civil Defence & Emergency Management remained a business unit of the Department of Internal Affairs until 1 April 2014, when it was transferred to the Department of Prime Minister and Cabinet. This was intended to reflect DMPC's role as the government's lead agency in national security planning.

Beginning 1 December 2019, the Ministry's name was changed to the National Emergency Management Agency (NEMA). Its structure was also changed, with it becoming a departmental agency and the appointment of NEMA's first interim chief executive (rather than reporting through to the chief executive of DPMC). A departmental agency is an operationally autonomous agency with its own chief executive, hosted by a department of the New Zealand public service.

Activities
The Agency administers the Civil Defence Emergency Management Act 2002 and:
 provides advice to government on civil defence emergency management matters
 identifies hazards and risks
 develops, maintains and evaluates the effectiveness of the civil defence emergency management strategic framework
 ensures coordination at local, regional, and national levels
 promotes civil defence emergency management and deliver public awareness about how to prepare for, and what to do in, an emergency
 supports civil defence emergency management sector capability development, planning and operations, including developing guidelines and standards
 monitors and evaluates the performance of the 16 regional Civil Defence Emergency Management Groups
 maintains and operates the National Crisis Management Centre, including the maintenance of a duty team to staff the Centre, and issue warnings and public information
 manages the central government response to, and recovery from, large scale emergencies resulting from geological (earthquakes, volcanic unrest, landslides, tsunami), meteorological (coastal hazards, floods, severe winds, snow) and infrastructure failure.

Since 2017, Civil Defence has utilised Emergency Mobile Alert technologies to deliver essential emergency information to mobile phones in New Zealand. They test it every year to make sure the system is working correctly. During the 2017 Mobile Alert test, Vodafone accidentally sent the test alert message at 1 AM.

List of Ministers for Emergency Management
Key

See also
 Lifeline utility

References

External links
 Official website
 Get Ready Get Thru, the Ministry's multilingual public education campaign

Emergency management in New Zealand
Civil defense
New Zealand public service departmental agencies